Nesar Ahmad Bahawi , born March 27, 1984 in Kapisa Province) is an Afghan Taekwondo practitioner. He won the silver medal in the lightweight category (72 kg) at the 2007 World Taekwondo Championships, edging out 2004 Olympic Champion Hadi Saei in the semifinals. It was the second international medal for Afghanistan in any sport – the first was one by Badamgul Multazim, a heavyweight Taekwondo practitioner.

Nesar won the bronze medal in the lightweight category at the 2006 Asian Games, and represented Afghanistan in the -68kg category at the Beijing Olympics, where he also acted as flagbearer in the opening ceremony. Nesar won the gold medal in the 2009 Asian Martial Arts Games for taekwondo in the 72 kg weight range category. In 2010, he won the silver medal in the men's under 80 kg category at the 2010 Asian Games.

Nesar acted as flagbearer for Afghanistan again at the 2012 London Olympics, where he competed in the -80 kg category.  On August 10, while suffering from a leg injury, he advanced from the preliminaries to the quarterfinals where he was defeated by Sebastián Crismanich of Argentina. As Sebastián advanced to the gold medal match, Nesar advanced to the bronze medal match, where he lost 0–4 against Mauro Sarmiento of Italy.

References

 Nesar Ahmad Bahawi's profile at BBC Sports

External links
 
 

1984 births
Living people
Taekwondo practitioners at the 2008 Summer Olympics
Taekwondo practitioners at the 2012 Summer Olympics
Afghan male taekwondo practitioners
Olympic taekwondo practitioners of Afghanistan
Asian Games silver medalists for Afghanistan
Taekwondo practitioners at the 2010 Asian Games
Asian Games medalists in taekwondo
Taekwondo practitioners at the 2006 Asian Games
Asian Games bronze medalists for Afghanistan
Medalists at the 2006 Asian Games
Medalists at the 2010 Asian Games
World Taekwondo Championships medalists